The name Romero is a nickname type of surname for a Roman or an Italian. The name was originally derived from the Latin word Romaeus and the Greek word Romaios, which mean Roman.

A person on a religious journey or pilgrimage from Rome (possibly to Jerusalem)

Other variations of the surname
Roemer, a Middle High German and Swiss name meaning a pilgrim to the Holy Land
Romer, an English and Dutch name meaning a religious pilgrim or religious warrior carrying a sacred object on his way to the Holy Land
Rohmer, an Icelandic name meaning a guardian of a sacred place
Romeo, an Italian name meaning a pilgrim to Rome
Romeu, a Portuguese and Catalan name meaning someone on a pilgrimage to the Holy Land
Romeos, a Modern Greek name meaning pilgrim to Jerusalem
Romemu, a Hebraic word meaning one who exalts or glorifies a deity
Robero, a surname derived from the given name Robert

In the genealogical record in the Philippines 
Romero is one of the surnames that were given by the Spaniards during the Spanish colonial era in the Philippines and the rest of other colonial nations in order to avoid confusion and technically, as a replacement of the indigenous surnames that were difficult to pronounce among Spaniards, altogether with the Catholic conversions as well. Majority of the ethnic Filipinos did not inherit their Spanish surnames, but obtained them for colonial purposes.

Surname
A list of people with the surname Romero:

Academics
Aldemaro Romero Jr. (born 1951), Venezuelan-American biologist
E. Antonio Romero (1925–2005), Guatemalan philosopher, historian and writer
Francisco Romero (1891–1962), Argentine philosopher
Xavier Romero Frías (born 1954), Spanish anthropologist

Artists and designers
Covadonga Romero Rodríguez (1917–2018), Spanish artist
Brenda Romero (born 1966), American computer game designer and developer
Enrique Badía Romero (born 1930), Spanish comics artist known as Romero
Frank Romero (born 1941), American painter, part of the Chicano art movement.
John Romero (born 1967), American computer game programmer and designer

Politics and activists
Alfredo Romero (born 1969), Venezuelan lawyer and human rights activist
Anthony D. Romero (born 1965), American lawyer, executive director of the American Civil Liberties Union
Carlos Romero Barceló (1932–2021), Puerto Rican politician
Carmen Romero Rubio (1864–1944), former Mexican First Lady
Christy Goldsmith Romero, American lawyer, Special Inspector General of the Troubled Asset Relief Program
Edward L. Romero (born 1934), American entrepreneur and diplomat
Flerida Ruth Pineda-Romero (1929–2017), former Associate Justice of the Supreme Court of the Philippines
Gloria Romero (born 1955), American politician
Ignacio Romero Osborne (1903-1985), Spanish Carlist activist
Ignacio Romero Raizábal (1901-1975), Spanish writer and Carlist activist
Jorge Romero Romero (1964–2021), Mexican politician
Juan Carlos Romero (born 1950), Argentine politician, son of Roberto Romero, senator of the Salta Province
Kate de Romero, former Puerto Rican First Lady
Melinda Romero Donnelly (born 1971), Puerto Rican politician
Miguel Romero (born 1970), Puerto Rican politician
St. Óscar Romero (1917–1980), assassinated Salvadoran Roman Catholic Archbishop
Regina Romero (born 1974), American politician, mayor of Tucson, Arizona
Richard M. Romero (born 1944), American politician
Roberto Romero (1927–1992), Argentine businessman, founder of El Tribuno newspaper, governor of Salta Province
Trinidad Romero (1835–1918), American politician and rancher

Cinema and television
Carlos Romero (1927–2007), American actor
Cesar Romero (1907–1994), American actor
Chanda Romero (born 1954), Filipina actress
Constantino Romero (1947–2013), Spanish actor, voice actor and presenter
Eddie Romero (1924–2013), Filipino film director
George A. Romero (1940–2017), American film director
Gloria Romero (born 1933), Filipina actress
Pia Romero (former stage name of Pia Alonzo Wurtzbach; born 1989), Filipina actress, model and beauty queen

Music
Aldemaro Romero (1928–2007), Venezuelan musician
Chan Romero (born 1941), American rock and roll singer
Danny Romero (born 1995), Spanish singer born Daniel Ramírez Romero
Dyango (born 1940), Spanish musician born José Gómez Romero
Eladio Romero Santos (1937–2001), Dominican musician
Jesús Adrián Romero (born 1965), Mexican Christian worship singer
Nicky Romero (born 1989), Dutch electronic music producer and DJ
Paul Romero (born 1965), United States computer game music composer
The Romeros, Spanish classical guitar quartet featuring:
Celedonio Romero (1913–1996), classical guitarist, poet and composer
Celin Romero (born 1936), classical guitarist (son of Celedonio)
Pepe Romero (born 1944), classical guitarist (son of Celedonio)
Angel Romero (born 1946), classical guitarist and conductor (son of Celedonio)

Sports
Romero (bullfighter family), a dynasty of 18th and 19th century bullfighters from Ronda, Andalusia, Spain, its most famous members being:
Francisco Romero (1700–1763), Spanish bullfighter
Juan Romero, Spanish bullfighter
José Romero, Spanish bullfighter
Pedro Romero (1754–1839), Spanish bullfighter
Alfredo Romero (athlete) (born 1972), Puerto Rican track and field athlete
Andrés Romero (born 1967), Chilean footballer
Andrés Romero (born 1981), Argentine golfer
Ángel Romero (1932–2007), Mexican cyclist
Ángel Romero (born 1992), Paraguayan footballer
Antonio Romero (born 1968), Mexican sprint canoeist
Arturo Colón Romero (born 1928), Puerto Rican chess master
Austin Romero (born 1981), American ring announcer known as Mike Rome
Camilo Romero (born 1970), Mexican football (soccer) player
Carmen Romero (born 1950), Cuban discus thrower
Cibeles Romero (born 1978), Spanish field hockey player
Cristian Romero (born 1998), Argentine footballer
Curro Romero (born 1933), Spanish bullfighter (not a member the Romero dynasty)
Eduardo Romero (1954–2022), Argentine golfer
Enrique Romero (born 1971), Spanish footballer
Gonzalo Romero (born 1975), Guatemalan footballer
J. C. Romero (born 1976), Puerto Rican baseball player
Jhon Romero (born 1995), Colombian baseball player
John Romero (born 1976), American football player
JoJo Romero (born 1996), American baseball player
Jordan Romero (born 1996), American mountain climber, the youngest person to climb the Seven Summits - the highest peaks on every continent
José Romero (1878–????), Cuban baseball player
Jose Romero (born 1971), Chilean Australian rules footballer
José 'Joselito' Romero Jiménez (born 1985), Spanish footballer
José Romero Santos (born 1936), Cuban rower
José Antonio Romero Morilla (born 1980), Spanish football manager
José Luis Romero (born 1945), Spanish footballer and coach
José Santos Romero (born 1951), Argentine footballer and manager
Julio César Romero (born 1960), Paraguayan footballer
Leo Romero (born 1986), Mexican American professional skateboarder
Leticia Romero (born 1995), Spanish basketball player
Liborio Romero (born 1979), Mexican boxer
Luka Romero (born 2004), Mexican footballer
Mario Antonio Romero (born 1980), Argentine footballer
Mary Romero (born 1985), Spanish professional boxer
Mauricio Martín Romero (born 1983), Argentine footballer
Miguel Ángel Sebastián Romero (born 1979), Argentine footballer who plays for Independiente Rivadavia
Miguel Colón Romero, Puerto Rican chess master
Óscar Romero (born 1992), Paraguayan footballer
Oscar Romero (born 1996), American soccer player
Pablo Romero (born c. 1960), Cuban amateur boxer
Ramón Romero (1959–1988), Dominican baseball player
Randy Romero (1957–2019), American jockey
Raúl Romero (born 1935), Argentine wrestler
Rafael Romero (1938–2021), Venezuelan track and field athlete
Rebecca Romero (born 1980), British track cyclist and rower
Ricardo Romero (1899–????), Chilean Olympic fencer
Ricardo Romero (born 1978), American mixed martial arts fighter
Ricky Romero (1931–2006), American professional wrestler
Ricky Romero (born 1984), American baseball pitcher
Rito Romero (1927–2001), Mexican professional wrestler
Rocky Romero (born 1982), ring name of Cuban-born American professional wrestler John Rivera
Rolland Romero (1914–1975), American triple jumper
Sebastián Ariel Romero (born 1978), Argentine footballer
Sergio Romero (born 1987), Argentine football goalkeeper
Seth Romero (born 1996), American baseball player
Tommy Romero (born 1997), American baseball player
Vicente Romero (born 1987), Spanish footballer
Yoel Romero (born 1977), Cuban mixed martial artist
Hermes Romero (born 1970), Cuban strength and conditioning coach and physical therapist

Fictional characters 

 Romero, a fictional character in the anime series Beyblade

 Romero Malcolm, a fictional character in the book series "All For The Game".

See also
Christian Initiative Romero, a non-profit organisation in Germany working in support of industrial law and human rights in Central America, named after Óscar Romero

Spanish-language surnames
Surnames of Spanish origin

ca:Romero
cs:Romero
es:Romero (desambiguación)
fr:Romero
it:Romero
lt:Romero
nl:Romero
ja:ロメロ
pt:Romero
ru:Ромеро